15 km is a rural locality (a settlement) in Topkinskoye Rural Settlement of Topkinsky District, Russia. The  population was 0 as of 2010.

Streets 
There is no streets with titles.

References 

Rural localities in Kemerovo Oblast